The tibialis anterior muscle is a muscle in humans that originates along the upper two-thirds of the lateral (outside) surface of the tibia and inserts into the medial cuneiform and first metatarsal bones of the foot. It acts to dorsiflex and invert the foot. This muscle is mostly located near the shin.

It is situated on the lateral side of the tibia; it is thick and fleshy above, tendinous below. The tibialis anterior overlaps the anterior tibial vessels and deep peroneal nerve in the upper part of the leg.

Structure

Origin 
The tibialis anterior muscle arises from:

 the lateral condyle of the tibia.
 the upper 2/3 of the lateral surface of the tibia.
 the adjoining part of the interosseous membrane.
 the deep surface of the fascia.
 the intermuscular septum between it and the extensor digitorum longus.

Insertion 
The fibers of this circumpennate muscle are relatively parallel to the plane of insertion, ending in a tendon, apparent on the anteriomedial dorsal aspect of the foot close to the ankle.

It passes through the most medial compartments of the transverse and cruciate crural ligaments. It is inserted into the medial and under surface of the medial cuneiform bone and the base of the first metatarsal bone.

Nerve supply
The tibialis anterior muscle is supplied by the deep fibular nerve (L4, L5), a branch of common fibular nerve.

Variation 
A deep portion of the muscle is rarely inserted into the talus, or a tendinous slip may pass to the head of the first metatarsal bone or the base of the first phalanx of the great toe.

The tibiofascialis anterior, a small muscle from the lower part of the tibia to the transverse or cruciate crural ligaments or deep fascia.

Function 
The tibialis anterior muscle is the most medial muscle of the anterior compartment of the leg. It is responsible for dorsiflexing and inverting the foot, and is the largest dorsiflexor of the foot. The muscle has two origins, one being the lateral tibial condyle and the other being the upper lateral surface of the tibia, and inserts on the medial surface of the medial cuneiform and adjoining part of base of the first metatarsal of the foot allowing the toe to be pulled up and held in a locked position. It also allows for the ankle to be inverted giving the ankle horizontal movement allowing for some cushion if the ankle were to be rolled. It is innervated by the deep peroneal nerve and acts as both an antagonist and a synergist of the tibialis posterior. However, the most accurate antagonist of the tibialis anterior is the peroneus longus. The tibialis anterior aids in the activities of walking, running, hiking, kicking a ball, or any activity that requires moving the leg or keeping the leg vertical. It functions to stabilize the ankle as the foot hits the ground during the contact phase of walking (eccentric contraction) and acts later to pull the foot clear of the ground during the swing phase (concentric contraction). It also functions to 'lock' the ankle, as in toe-kicking a ball, when held in an isometric contraction.

Antagonists are plantar-flexors of the posterior compartment such as soleus and gastrocnemius.

The movements of tibialis anterior are dorsiflexion and inversion of the ankle. However, actions of tibialis anterior are dependent on whether the foot is weight bearing or not (closed or open kinetic chain). When the foot is on the ground, the muscle helps to balance the leg and talus on the other tarsal bones so that the leg is kept vertical even when walking on uneven ground.

Clinical significance 

Some clinicians attempt to treat tibialis anterior muscle issues with acupuncture techniques, such as dry needling. There is significant bias in studies evaluating the efficacy of acupuncture versus medical treatments, and the decision to use acupuncture should be made carefully.

A tibialis anterior hernia is a rare type of hernia in which fat or other material protrudes through a defect in the tibialis anterior muscle. It may be caused by trauma, such as an inadvertent kick to the lower leg from an opposing player in a football match.

Additional images 
medial view of dissected ankle has two muscles

See also 

 Tibialis posterior muscle

References

External links 

 
 Tibialis Anterior from Wheeless' Textbook of Orthopaedics

Calf muscles
Muscles of the lower limb